Patrick Douglas Hamill (born 27 November 1950) is a Scottish former amateur footballer who played in the Scottish League for Queen's Park and Hamilton Academical as a forward. He was capped by Scotland at amateur level.

Career statistics

References

Scottish footballers
Scottish Football League players
Queen's Park F.C. players
Association football forwards
Scotland amateur international footballers
Hamilton Academical F.C. players
1950 births
Footballers from Greenock
Living people